The Tarrasch Defense is a chess opening characterized by the moves:

1. d4 d5
2. c4 e6
3. Nc3 c5

The Tarrasch is a variation of the Queen's Gambit Declined.

Black's third move is an aggressive bid for central . After White plays cxd5 and dxc5, Black will be left with an isolated pawn on d5.

The opening was advocated by the German player Siegbert Tarrasch, who contended that the increased  Black enjoys is well worth the inherent weakness of the isolated center pawn. Although many other masters, after the teachings of Wilhelm Steinitz, rejected the Tarrasch Defense out of hand because of the pawn weakness, Tarrasch continued to play his opening while rejecting other variations of the Queen's Gambit, even to the point of putting question marks on routine moves in all variations except the Tarrasch (which he awarded an exclamation mark) in his book Die moderne Schachpartie.  (See chess punctuation.)

The Tarrasch Defense is considered . Even if Black fails to make use of their mobility and winds up in an inferior endgame, tied to the defense of their isolated pawn, they may be able to hold the draw if they defend accurately.

In the Encyclopedia of Chess Openings, the Tarrasch Defense has codes D32 through D34.

Main line: 4.cxd5 exd5 5.Nf3 Nc6 6.g3 Nf6 

In the main line, White will isolate Black's queen pawn with 4. cxd5 exd5 and attempt to exploit its weakness. The most common setup is to fianchetto the king's bishop in order to put pressure on the isolated d5-pawn, as 3...c5 has relinquished the possibility of protecting the point d5 by means of ...c6.

After 4.cxd5, Black may offer the Hennig-Schara Gambit with 4...cxd4. While this was once essayed by Alexander Alekhine, it has never achieved popularity at master level and is considered advantageous for White.

On the third move White often plays 3.Nf3 instead (in part to avoid the Hennig-Schara Gambit), which after 3...c5 4.cxd5 exd5 5.Nc3 transposes to the main line.

7. Bg2 Be7 8. 0-0 0-0

In modern praxis, 9.Bg5 is most frequently played here, though there are other ideas of note, 9.dxc5 and 9.b3 being the main alternatives. (Other lines are 9.Be3, 9.Bf4, and 9.a3.)

During the 2010's, the hitherto forgotten line 1.d4 d5 2.c4 e6 3.Nf3 Nf6 4.Nc3 c5 5.cxd5 exd5 6.g3 Nc6 7.Bg2 cxd4 8.Nxd4 Bc5 became a topic of theoretical debate at the top level mainly due to the efforts of Russian grandmaster Daniil Dubov. This approach to the Tarrasch Defense is therefore known as the Dubov Tarrasch.

Swedish Variation

The Swedish Variation (also called the Folkestone Variation) is a  line beginning 6... c4. Black now has a four to three  pawn , and will try to expand with ...b5, with White aiming for a central break with e4. The line is considered somewhat dubious and is rarely seen in modern practice.

The Swedish Variation has ECO code D33.

See also
 List of chess openings
 List of chess openings named after people
 Semi-Tarrasch Defense

References

 
 

Chess openings